Haim Landau (10 September 1916 – 16 October 1981) was an Israeli independence fighter, Knesset member and Minister in the government of Menachem Begin.

Career
Landau was born in Kraków, Austria-Hungary (today in Poland) and made aliyah to Mandate Palestine in 1935. He soon joined Betar and the Irgun and, according to the Irgun website, "took part in reprisals against the Arabs" while still finding time to complete his studies at the Technion as a construction engineer.

By 1940, he was a commander of the Betar branch in Haifa, and in early 1944 was transferred to Tel Aviv and appointed member of the General Headquarters by the end of year. In 1947, he represented the Irgun, together with Begin and Shmuel Katz, at a meeting with the UNSCOP.

Post-independence
Landau was among the founders of the Herut, and was a member of the first to eighth Knessets. He was a member of the Begin cabinet, serving as Minister of Development in 1967–1970 and despite not retaining his seat in the 1977 elections, was made Minister of Transport by Menachem Begin, a role he retained until the 1981 elections. After his death, the Ministry of Transportation renamed Highway 5 after him.

References

External links

1916 births
1981 deaths
Engineers from Kraków
Polish emigrants to Mandatory Palestine
Irgun members
Technion – Israel Institute of Technology alumni
Herut politicians
Gahal politicians
Likud politicians
Members of the 1st Knesset (1949–1951)
Members of the 2nd Knesset (1951–1955)
Members of the 3rd Knesset (1955–1959)
Members of the 4th Knesset (1959–1961)
Members of the 5th Knesset (1961–1965)
Members of the 6th Knesset (1965–1969)
Members of the 7th Knesset (1969–1974)
Members of the 8th Knesset (1974–1977)
Ministers without portfolio
Ministers of Development of Israel
Ministers of Transport of Israel
Jewish Israeli politicians